Pavel Pavlovich Pavlenko (20 September 1902 – 9 March 1993) was a Soviet stage and film actor.

Life
Born in Kiev, he later moved to Moscow and graduated in 1919 from the Moscow City Theatrical School named for Anatoly Lunacharsky. He tried to join the Moscow Operetta, but was rejected by Grigory Yaron, who said, "We do not need a second Yaron!"

He debuted on the stage in 1920. He worked in the Moscow Ukrainian Theater, in the Children's Theater, and elsewhere. During the Great Patriotic War, he played in the Mossovet Theatre.

After the war, he appeared more frequently in films, and was a favorite of Aleksandr Rou. His film career came to an end in the late seventies. He died in obscurity in Moscow in 1993.

Filmography
 1946  —  The Great Glinka (Глинка) as Faddey Bulgarin
 1952  —  Composer Glinka (Композитор Глинка) as Faddey Bulgarin
 1952  —  The Inspector (Ревизор) as Superintendent of Schools
 1953  —  Attack from the Sea (Корабли штурмуют бастионы) as Paul I of Russia
 1957  —  The Height (Высота) as Old installer
 1957  —  The Duel (Поединок) as Svetlovidov
 1958  — The Captain's Daughter (Капитанская дочка) as Solomin
 1958  — Our Correspondent (Наш корреспондент) as Fedotov
 1960  — Summer Vacation (Время летних отпусков) as Boroday
 1960  — Fishers of Sponges (Ловцы губок) as Baburis
 1963  — Kingdom of Crooked Mirrors (Королевство Кривых Зеркал) as Master of ceremonies
 1963  — Lost Summer (Пропало лето) as Grandfather Yevgeny
 1963  — The Big Fuse (Большой фитиль)  as Assistant to the Chairman
 1964  — Jack Frost as Nastya's father
 1966  — The Ugly Story (Скверный анекдот) as Akim Petrovich Zubikov
 1967  — Fire, Water, and Brass Pipes (Огонь, вода и… медные трубы) as Vodyanoy
 1968  — The Little Golden Calf (Золотой телёнок) as Funt
 1968  — The Brothers Karamazov (Братья Карамазовы) as Zosima
 1969  — Adam and Heva (Адам и Хева) as Old Dagestani
 1970  — You Are Taimyr (Вас вызывает Таймыр) as Grandfather Babourine
 1970  — Carousel (Карусель) as Ivan
 1973  — Much Ado About Nothing (Много шума из ничего) as Dogberry
 1976  — Twelve Chairs (12 стульев) as  Club guard

References

External links
 

1902 births
1993 deaths
Actors from Kyiv
Soviet male film actors
Honored Artists of the RSFSR
Soviet male stage actors
Russian Academy of Theatre Arts alumni